An annular solar eclipse occurred on Tuesday, December 3, 1918. A solar eclipse occurs when the Moon passes between Earth and the Sun, thereby totally or partly obscuring the image of the Sun for a viewer on Earth. An annular solar eclipse occurs when the Moon's apparent diameter is smaller than the Sun's, blocking most of the Sun's light and causing the Sun to look like an annulus (ring). An annular eclipse appears as a partial eclipse over a region of the Earth thousands of kilometres wide. Annularity was visible from Chile including the capital city Santiago, Argentina including capital Buenos Aires, southern Uruguay including capital Montevideo, northeastern tip of South West Africa (today's Namibia) and southwestern Portuguese Angola (today's Angola). Aconcagua, the highest mountain outside Asia, also lies in the path of annularity.

Related eclipses

Solar eclipses of 1916–1920

Saros 131

Notes

References

1918 12 3
1918 in science
1918 12 3
December 1918 events